Six Rivers Charter High School (SRCHS) is a WASC accredited charter school part of the Northern Humboldt Union High School District. It is located on Arcata High School's campus at 1720 M Street in downtown Arcata, California. The school charter places a limit on the number of students in attendance at one hundred.

The school opened on August 30, 2004. The founding principal was Chris Hartley, later elected as the Humboldt County Superintendent of Schools.

References

High schools in Humboldt County, California
Charter high schools in California
Educational institutions established in 2004
2004 establishments in California